Binzer is a surname. Notable people with the surname include:

 August Daniel von Binzer (1793–1868), German poet and journalist
 Harry A. Binzer (1897–1959), member of the Washington State Senate
 Joseph R. Binzer (born 1955), American Catholic prelate

See also
 Shifty Shellshock (born 1974), real name Seth Binzer

German-language surnames